Yeniqışlaq (also, Imeni Dvadtsat’-Shesti Bakinskiskikh Komissarov, Yeni-Kishlag, Yeni-Kishlak, and Yenikyshlak) is a village and municipality in the Neftchala Rayon of Azerbaijan.  It has a population of 652.  The municipality consists of the villages of Yeniqışlaq and Haqverdilər.

References

External links 

Populated places in Neftchala District